In the 1303 papal conclave, Benedict XI was elected to succeed Boniface VIII as pope.

Proceedings
Pope Boniface VIII was buried at St. Peter's Basilica on 12 October 1303, in a tomb which he had prepared for himself. The manhandling of Boniface VIII by the forces of France and the Colonna family before his death gave the cardinals second thoughts about electing anyone hostile to the interests of Philip IV of France.

The Conclave took place at the Vatican Palace next to St. Peter's, where Pope Boniface VIII had died on 11 October 1303.  The Conclave began with the Mass of the Holy Spirit on 21 October, and voting began the next morning.  A Dominican, and the Order's former Master General (1296-1298), Niccolò Boccasini was unanimously elected Pope Benedict XI on the first scrutiny. Niccolò Boccasini and Pedro Rodriguez were the only cardinals, of the seventeen or eighteen, who had stayed with Boniface VIII at Anagni when the papal residence was invaded by the French and the Colonna, and the Pope seized and imprisoned. Benedict's choice of numbering indicates that Antipope Benedict X was considered a legitimate pope at that time.  Benedict XI was crowned at the Vatican Basilica on Sunday, 27 October 1303 by Cardinal Matteo Rosso Orsini, the prior Diaconorum.

The new pope, Niccolò Boccasini of Treviso, was Italian but not Roman, and thus considered neutral in the disputes between the Roman clans, and the international struggle between Charles II and Philip IV. Benedict XI refused to excommunicate Philip IV or the Colonna, but also refused to restore to the Colonna their properties that had been seized by Boniface VIII.

Pope Benedict left a detailed account of the conclave that elected him, describing how it closely adhered to the procedures mandated in the papal bull Ubi periculum.

Cardinal electors

Two other cardinals, Giacomo and Pietro Colonna (uncle and nephew), had been deposed by Pope Boniface VIII and were thus ineligible to participate in the election.

Notes

References
Fietta, Lorenzo. 1874. Niccolò Boccasini e il suo tempo (Padova 1874).
Souchon, Martin. 1888.  Die Papstwahlen von Bonifaz VIII bis Urban VI (Braunschweig: Benno Goeritz 1888), pp. 15–23.
Gregorovius, Ferdinand. 1906. History of Rome in the Middle Ages, Volume V. 2, second edition, revised (London: George Bell, 1906), Book X, chapter 5, pp. 515–525.
Baumgartner, Frederic J. 2003. Behind Locked Doors: A History of the Papal Elections. Palgrave Macmillan. .
Sibilio, Vito. 2004.  Benedetto XI: Il papa tra Roma e Avignone (2004). 
Sartor, Ivano. 2005. Papa Benedetto XI (Nicolo Boccasino) beato di Treviso (Editrice S. Liberale: 2005). 
Conclave of 1303 (Prof. J. P. Adams)

14th-century elections
1303
1303
14th-century Catholicism